Gaetanina Calvi ( 1887 Milan – 1964 Carate Brianza) was an Italian engineer. She was the first woman to graduate from Polytechnic University of Milan, in 1913, and second in Italy after Emma Strada.

Life 
She graduated from the Isep Parin high school. In the academic year 1908/1909, she enrolled in civil engineering at the Polytechnic University of Milan. She graduated in 1913 with 85/100.

She worked for the engineers Gardella and Martini in Milan. She taught mathematics at the Istituto dei Ciechi.

In 1940, with the entry of Italy into the second world war, she retired from teaching.

She worked as a freelancer until her death, in Carate Brianza in 1964.

References 

1887 births
1964 deaths
Polytechnic University of Milan alumni
Italian engineers